The 1945 Cork Senior Hurling Championship was the 57th staging of the Cork Senior Hurling Championship since its establishment by the Cork County Board in 1887. The draw for the opening round fixtures took place at the Cork Convention on 28 January 1945. The championship began on 13 May 1945 and ended on 16 September 1945.

Glen Rovers were the defending champions.

On 16 September 1945, Glen Rovers won the championship following a 4–10 to 5–3 defeat of Carrigdhoun in the final. This was their 10th championship title overall and their second title in succession.

Results

First round

Sarsfields received a bye in this round.

Second round

Glen Rovers and St. Finbarr's received byes in this round.

Semi-finals

Final

Championship statistics

Miscellaneous

 Carrigdhoun became the first divisional side to qualify for the championship final.

References

Cork Senior Hurling Championship
Cork Senior Hurling Championship